Mines Rovers Football Club is an Australian rules football team playing in the Goldfields Football League, a league based in the Goldfields region of Western Australia. Founded in 1898 as Mines Rovers Football Club, the club has enjoyed a long-standing involvement within in the league. One of the first clubs to play Australian football formed within the region, and helped popularise the sport, and supplant Rugby in popularity. The GFL was known as the Goldfields Football Association (GFA) from 1901 to 1907 and 1920–25, and as the Goldfields National Football League (GNFL) from 1926 to 1987. Mines Rovers play home games at Digger Daws Oval, one they are co tenants with other GFL member, Boulder City Football Club. Mines Rovers currently hold the record for most premierships in the GFL with 43.

History 
The club was formed on Thursday 30 March 1898 during a meeting held at Powell's Hotel in Kalgoorlie. The club was originally simply known as 'Mines' and wore the colours of black and white. The club tasted early success, winning the last Hannans District Football Association premiership in 1900 and the inaugural Goldfields Football Association premiership in 1901.

Song 

 Good old Diorites forever,
 Good old mighty white and blue.
 No matter what the situation,
 Mines Rovers will win through.
 Never mind the opposition,
 Our tradition gives us might.
 Stick at the task and never falter,
 For you're a Diorite.

Grand final appearances 
The list of grand final appearance including premiership teams and runners-up is detailed below.

Western Australian state premiership 
During early periods of West Australian football, the Western Australian state premiership was contested intermittently between 1903 and 1924 between the winners of the Western Australian Football Association and Goldfields Football Association. Mines Rovers competed on 3 occasions but were unsuccessful on their attempts. Their closest match was a draw with East Fremantle but were beaten in the replay.

Matches played

Notable players 
 John Woollard – Port Adelaide captain 1910.
 Lou Daily – 1935 Sandover Medalist for Subiaco.
 Jaymie Graham – played for  &  coaching staff.
 Tom Outridge – inaugural winner of the Sandover Medal in 1921.
 "Nipper" Truscott – Australian Football Hall of Fame member.
 Eddie Betts – 's leading goalkicker 2010 and 2012.
 Dom Sheed - 2018 West Coast premiership player.
Luke Robertson - Mines Rovers colts

See also 

 Australian rules football in the Goldfields region of Western Australia

References

Notes

Footnotes

Australian rules football competitions in Western Australia
Sports leagues established in 1896
Goldfields Football League